The Box 13 scandal was a political scandal that occurred in Jim Wells County, Texas during the Senate election of 1948, regarding disputed votes in a Democratic primary involving Lyndon B. Johnson and Coke Stevenson.

Origins and investigation 

On the day of the election, Johnson appeared to have lost the Democratic run-off primary to Stevenson. Six days after polls had closed, 202 additional ballots were found in Precinct 13 of Jim Wells County, 200 for Johnson and 2 for Stevenson. These resulted in a victory for Johnson, and his nomination as the Democrat in the upcoming general Senate election. Johnson went on to defeat Jack Porter of the Republican Party by a margin of 33.28% and 353,320 votes, thus becoming Senator from Texas.

The recount, handled by the Democratic State Central Committee, took a week. Johnson was announced the winner by 87 votes out of 988,295, an extremely narrow margin of victory. Suspicions arose that the 202 late votes were fraudulent. The added names were in alphabetical order and written with the same pen and handwriting, at the end of the list of voters. Some of the persons in this part of the list insisted that they had not voted that day. 

Stevenson took the dispute to court, eventually reaching the U.S. Supreme Court. Johnson prevailed on the basis that jurisdiction over naming a nominee rested with the state party, not the federal government. A private, non-official investigation was started, claiming that Johnson had conspired with George Parr, a member of the Democratic party in Texas, to falsify ballots.

Aftermath 
Election judge Luis Salas said in 1977 that he had certified 202 fraudulent ballots (200 for Johnson, 2 for Stevenson). Robert Caro made the case in his 1990 book that Johnson had stolen the election in Jim Wells County. 

A stage play based on the scandal, Box Thirteen by Jack Westin, was performed at the College of the Mainland Community Theatre during the 1998–1999 season.

References

Works cited

 
 

 

Lyndon B. Johnson
Political scandals in Texas
Electoral fraud in the United States
1948 in Texas